Istrouma Area Council serves Scouts in both Louisiana and Mississippi, primarily in the Greater Baton Rouge Area and Florida Parishes. Specifically, the council includes Scouts from the following parishes: Ascension, East Baton Rouge, West Baton Rouge, East Feliciana, West Feliciana, Iberville, Pointe Coupee, St. Helena, St. James, St. Tammany, Washington, and Tangipahoa. Wilkinson County is the sole Mississippi county in the council.

Istrouma Area Council participates in various activities, primarily in and around Baton Rouge. Since 1935, Scouts from the council serve as ushers and stretcher bearers at LSU home football games at Tiger Stadium. Each district holds an annual Camporee at Camp Avondale in the spring, and most districts hold Cub Scout Day Camps for a week at various locales within their district. Each district also holds a district Pinewood Derby event for Cub Scouts.

History
Scouting came to Louisiana shortly after the establishment of the Boy Scouts of America in 1910. Rev. T. M. Hunter of the First Presbyterian Church of Baton Rouge established the first troop in that year, and two years later, affiliated the troop with BSA. The Istrouma Area Council was officially established in 1919. In 1923, the Rotary Club of Baton Rouge presented the council with a  campsite in Greenwell Springs called Camp Istrouma. After the council outgrew the camp, they raised money to move to the Avondale Scout Reservation located in East Feliciana Parish, doing so by the late 1950s. Istrouma was later sold to the United Methodist Church and serves as a Christian camp to this day.

In 1917, the Baton Rouge Council (#211) was formed, changing its name to the East Baton Rouge Parish Council (#211) in 1922. It changed its name to the Istrouma Area Council (#211)  in 1924.

Organization
The council is administratively divided into districts:
 Avondale District—includes East and West Feliciana Parishes, northern portion of East Baton Rouge Parish, Pointe Coupee Parish, and Wilkinson County, Mississippi
 Bogue Tuchenna District—includes St. Tammany and Washington Parishes
 Chappepeela District—includes Tangipahoa and eastern Livingston Parishes
 Red Stick District—includes inner-city Baton Rouge, primarily at-risk youths
 Tunica District—includes portions of East Baton Rouge and Livingston Parishes
 Sewell-Eagle District—includes North and South Baton Rouge
 Cypress Chauve District—includes Ascension and portions of St. James and Iberville Parishes
 Exploring District—includes Explorer Posts in Greater Baton Rouge
 Operation First Class District—includes Learning for Life Units

Camps

Avondale Scout Reservation

Avondale Scout Reservation is a  reservation for Scouting located in East Feliciana Parish, three miles (5 km) east of Clinton, on Louisiana Highway 10. It opened in 1959 and became the default campground for Istrouma after Camp Istrouma could no longer serve the needs of the council. There are five camping areas: Camp Avondale, Camp Hunter, McGee camping area, Tigator camping area, and Woodbadge Hill. The main camping area, Camp Avondale, is located at the north end of the reservation and is closest to the front entrance and ranger's houses on Highway 10. There are 17 campsites with a capacity for 360 campers. Most campsites are named after various birds, Indian tribes, and wildlife. The campsites are adjacent to Lake Istrouma with its swimming and canoeing facilities. A dining hall overlooks the lake. Camp Hunter is located 1/2 miles west of Lake Istrouma directly south of the front entrance of the reservation. It has nine campsites. The McGee camping area is at the south end of the reservation just inside of the back gate on Louisiana Highway 63. There are 26 campsites surrounding Lake McGee and south of Lake Tigator, all named after cities and towns represented by the council. The Tigator camping area has fourteen campsites north of Tigator Lake and has two buildings: Perkins Lodge and the Long House. The water tank near campsite 3 (Natchez) is the highest point on the reservation. Woodbadge Hill is located one-quarter mile southwest of Lake Istrouma and has ten campsites.

Camp Avondale hosts week-long summer camps for Boy Scouts in June in which Scouts can earn merit badges, participate in COPE, First Year Scouting, Shooting Scope, Aquatic, and various other activities. In conjunction with Boy Scout Camps, there are Webelos Resident Camps held in June. Other annual events include, but are not limited to: Winter Camp (held during the week between Christmas and New Year's Day), Brownsea Training for youth leaders, The camp sports a dining hall, which has been referred to as "Roadkill Cafe" since the early 2000s. In addition, there is, among other buildings, an outdoor chapel, rifle and shotgun shooting ranges, an archery range, boat dock, blacksmith's shop, and trading post.

In the late 1990s and early 2000s, efforts have been made to improve this campground. In 2001, the Manship family of Baton Rouge built a campground to accommodate handicapped Scouts. Since then, private restrooms and showers, running water, improved sewage and plumbing, better roads, and electricity have all been added to campsites for use by Scouts and Scouters. In addition, existing buildings have been renovated and expanded.

The southern part of the Avondale Scout Reservation, specifically, the area around Lakes Tigator and McGee, is used by Cub Scouts. In the early 2000s, Family Cub World was created in this area and includes numerous activity sites for Cub Scouts, as well as a dining hall, chapel, and cabines.

Camp Carruth
Camp Carruth is located in West Baton Rouge Parish off Rosedale Road. Istrouma Area Council purchased the land in the late 1990s, and this  campsite is used by Cub Scout and Boy Scout Units for both day events and overnight tent camping.

Order of the Arrow
Quinipissa Lodge #479 is used by the local Order of the Arrow units. It was established in 1952, and in 1969, the Caddo House at Camp Avondale was dedicated for its use.

See also
Scouting in Louisiana

References

Local councils of the Boy Scouts of America
Southern Region (Boy Scouts of America)
Youth organizations based in Louisiana
1919 establishments in Louisiana